State Route 528 (SR 528) is north–south state highway in the northeastern portion of the U.S. state of Ohio. The entire highway is a two-lane highway, that passes through woodland and farmland. SR 528 was commissioned in the mid-1930s on the same route. The highway was extended in 1940, to US 20, replacing another state route. In the mid-1960s the route was extended south to US 422.

Route description

SR 528 begins at a traffic signal with US 422 and SR 88, in Parkman. The southern terminus of SR 528 is also the southern terminus of SR 168. The route heads north concurrent with SR 88 and SR 168. The route passes through residential properties, before SR 168 turns due west leaving the concurrency. North of SR 168, the highway passes through woodland, with some houses, before SR 88 turns due east. SR 528 continues north passing through farmland and woodland, as a two-lane highway. The route has as an intersection with SR 608, south of Middlefield. The highway passes east of Middlefield having an intersection with SR 87. SR 528 continues north having an intersection with US 322 in Huntsburg Township. The road has an intersection with SR 86, followed by an intersection with US 6. North of US 6, SR 528 has an intersection with SR 166, before crossing into Lake County. After crossing into Lake County, the route crosses the Grand River and has a T-intersection with SR 307. The highway has an interchange with Interstate 90 (I–90). After I–90, SR 528 enters Madison, passing through residential properties. The road turns east concurrent with SR 84. SR 528 leaves SR 84 and heads north passes through commercial properties. The road crosses a CSX railroad track and a Norfolk Southern railroad tracks, before passing through residential properties. The road leaves Madison and passes through farmland. SR 528 has its northern terminus at a traffic signal with US 20. Continuing north after SR 528 ends is Lake County Road 7. No section of SR 528 is incorporated within the National Highway System (NHS).

History
In 1940 the route was extended north to U.S. Route 20, north of Madison, replacing the north–south section of SR 166. The route was extended to its current southern terminus in 1965.

Major intersections

References

External links

528
Transportation in Geauga County, Ohio
Transportation in Lake County, Ohio